Ho Chi-kung is currently the Deputy Minister of Health and Welfare of the Republic of China since 20 May 2016.

Early life
Ho did his bachelor's degree from Kaohsiung Medical University in 1984 and master's degree in public health from National Taiwan University in 1988.

Medical careers
At the Kaohsiung Medical University Hospital, Ho had been the Resident of the Department of Internal Medicine in 1988–1991, Chief Resident of the Department of Occupational Medicine in 1991–1992, Attending Physician of the Department of Occupational Medicine in 1992–1994, Director of the Department of Occupational and Environmental Medicine in 1994-2007 and Director of the Department of Community Medicine in 2003–2007.

References

Living people
Kaohsiung Medical University alumni
National Taiwan University alumni
Year of birth missing (living people)
21st-century Taiwanese politicians